Triphoturus is a genus of lanternfishes.

Species
There are currently three recognized species in this genus:
 Triphoturus mexicanus (C. H. Gilbert, 1890) (Mexican lampfish)
 Triphoturus nigrescens (A. B. Brauer, 1904) (Highseas lampfish)
 Triphoturus oculeum (Garman, 1899)

References

Myctophidae
Taxa named by Alec Fraser-Brunner
Marine fish genera